Jemalle Cornelius (born August 10, 1984) is a former American college and professional football player who was a wide receiver.  Cornelius played college football for the University of Florida, and was signed by the Buffalo Bills as an undrafted free agent in 2007.  He is currently a high school football coach.

Early years 

Cornelius was born in Fort Meade, Florida.  He attended Fort Meade High School, and he played for the Fort Meade Miners high school football team.

College career 

Cornelius accepted an athletic scholarship to attend the University of Florida in Gainesville, Florida, where he was a wide receiver and special teams standout for the Florida Gators football from 2002 to 2006 under head coaches Ron Zook and Urban Meyer.  As a senior in 2006, Cornelius became a starting wide receiver and team captain for the Gators' BCS National Championship team.

Professional career
Cornelius signed a future contract with the Arizona Cardinals on December 31. 2007.

Coaching career
Cornelius is currently the head coach at his alma mater, Fort Meade High School, where he was a star quarterback and wide receiver for the Miners' state runner-up teams in 1999, 2000 and 2001.

References

External links
 Florida Gators bio

1984 births
Living people
American football wide receivers
Arizona Cardinals players
Buffalo Bills players
Florida Gators football players
Indianapolis Colts players
High school football coaches in Florida
People from Fort Meade, Florida
Players of American football from Florida
African-American coaches of American football
African-American players of American football
21st-century African-American sportspeople
20th-century African-American people